Megachile brooksi is a species of bee in the family Megachilidae. It was described by Pauly in 2001.

References

Brooksi
Insects described in 2001